{{DISPLAYTITLE:C21H34O3}}
The molecular formula C21H34O3 may refer to:

 Tetrahydrodeoxycorticosterone (5β-Pregnane-3α,21-diol-20-one)
 5α-Pregnane-3α,17α-diol-20-one, also known as 17α-hydroxyallopregnanolone

Molecular formulas